John Kashmer (born November 6, 1978), better known by the ring name Johnny Kashmere, is an American professional wrestler. Kashmere has competed in Ring of Honor, Combat Zone Wrestling, Assault Championship Wrestling, and NWA New Jersey, and in Japan, Central America, Europe and Alaska. For much of his early career, he wrestled as one-half of The Backseat Boyz alongside Trent Acid.

Professional wrestling career 

In the late 1990s, Kashmere joined the CZW Wrestling Academy, where he was being trained by The Pitbulls, Gary Wolfe, and the late Anthony Durante. After graduating, Kashmere joined the CZW main roster and started teaming with Trent Acid as The Backseat Boyz, a play on the American vocal group, The Backstreet Boys. Together they would go on to win multiple tag team championships on the independent scene, including three reigns with the CZW World Tag Team Championship, and one reign with the ROH World Tag Team Championship. Kashmere has also once also held the CZW World Tag Team championship with Robbie Mireno, and once with Justice Pain.

The Backseat Boyz were put together by NWA New Jersey writer Don "Donnie B." Gucci, the twin brother of ECW original "Nova" Mike Bucci. Donnie B. also became their manager on the road and in NWA. Under Donnie's tutelage, Acid and Kashmere were hired by ECW to start in April, but ECW went out of business in February so they never debuted on ECW TV.

After leaving Ring of Honor and CZW in 2003, Kashmere began promoting Pro Wrestling Unplugged in Philadelphia and successfully ran over a hundred events in the Philly area. Many of those events were at the former ECW arena in Philadelphia.

When in June 2010, his longtime tag team partner Trent Acid died, Kashmere organized a tribute show in his honor. A month later, on July 10, 2010, Kashmere ran "The Acid Fest" at the former ECW Arena as a benefit event to assist in paying for Trent's burial services. In the main event, Johnny Kashmere (with Matt Walsh and Donnie B.) defeated Devon Moore (with Annie Social) in a singles match.

Personal life 

In 2001, Kashmere dropped out of Philadelphia University to begin his Japan Tours for Big Japan Pro Wrestling. In Japan, Kashmere was featured in multiple issues of Baseball Magazine's national wrestling publications and was a special guest on a nationally televised talk show.

In July 2010, Kashmere hung up his boots following his last match at The Acid Fest and returned to college to pursue a computer science degree. Today Kashmere is graduating with two degrees and beginning his career in the IT field and working on his post grad degrees. He plans on running events in the future, once school is behind him.

Kashmere has appeared on WWE Monday Night Raw, MTV, WWE Sunday Night Heat, Japan's Samurai TV, TNA Pay-Per-View, and many Philadelphia area local news segments.

Kashmere was nationally ranked in Pro Wrestling Magazine's Top 500 wrestlers in the world 9 out of 13 years that he competed in the ring.

Championships and accomplishments
Assault Championship Wrestling
ACW Tag Team Championship (1 time) – with Trent Acid

Big Japan Pro Wrestling
BJW Junior Heavyweight Championship (1 time)

Combat Zone Wrestling
CZW World Tag Team Championship (6 times) – with Robby Mireno (1), Justice Pain (1) and Trent Acid (4)

East Coast Wrestling Association
ECWA World Tag Team Championship (1 time) – with Trent Acid

Hardway Wrestling
HW Tag Team Championship (3 times) – with Trent Acid

Jersey All Pro Wrestling
JAPW World Tag Team Championship (2 times) – with Trent Acid

National Championship Wrestling
NCW Tag Team Championship (1 time) – with Trent Acid

Phoenix Championship Wrestling
PCW Tag Team Championship (1 time) – with Trent Acid

Pro Wrestling Illustrated
PWI ranked him #319 of the top 500 singles wrestlers in the PWI 500 in 2010
Ring of Honor
ROH World Tag Team Championship (1 time) – with Trent Acid

Other titles
POW Heavyweight Championship (1 time)
PWF Heavyweight Championship (2 times)

References

External links
 Johnny Kashmere
 Pro Wrestling Unplugged
 Wrestle Reality
 

American male professional wrestlers
The Dudley Brothers members
Living people
1978 births
Professional wrestlers from Pennsylvania
Professional wrestling promoters
ROH World Tag Team Champions
BJW Junior Heavyweight Champions (original version)
20th-century professional wrestlers
21st-century professional wrestlers